Two-handed or Double-handed may refer to:

 Ambidextrous
 Double-handed grip in tennis
 :Category:Two-person sailboats
 :Category:Two-player card games
 A melee weapon that requires two hands to wield, such as a 
 Two-handed sword
 Two-handed bowling
 Two-handed manual alphabet, alphabetic writing system
 Two-handed throwing, throwing sport aggregating distances thrown with each hand

See also
 Two-hander, play for two actors